Huahine – Fare Airport is an airport serving the island of Huahine in French Polynesia . The airport is located in the northern part of the commune of Fare, on the Island of Huahine Fare, French Polynesia.

In 2006, 151,907 passengers used the airport.

Airlines and destinations

Statistics

References

External links
Huahine-Fare Airport

Airports in French Polynesia
Huahine